St. Cecilia Cathedral is the cathedral church of the Roman Catholic Archdiocese of Omaha, USA. Located at 701 North 40th Street in the Gold Coast Historic District, the cathedral was ranked as one of the ten largest in the United States when it was completed in 1959. It is also listed on the National Register of Historic Places.

About
Begun in 1905 and consecrated in 1959, it was designed by architect Thomas Rogers Kimball. Ranked among the ten largest cathedrals in the United States when it was completed, the cathedral is 255 ft. long, 158 ft. wide and 222 ft. tall (78 m by 48 m by 68 m).

The architectural style of the building is Spanish Renaissance Revival, rather than the European Gothic architecture popular in the early 20th century. Kimball justified his choice because of the early influence of Spain and Mexico on the region. It was once part of the missionary area subject to the See of Santiago de Cuba.

On March 16, 2007, a painting of The Virgin Immaculata was reported stolen from St. Cecilia. About 7:30 am, church officials noticed the artwork had been cut from its frame. The painting was an 8 foot by 5 foot image, part of a collection donated to the cathedral in 2002. The painting had an estimated value of $100,000.

Organ
The organ of the cathedral was built by Pasi Organ Builders and inaugurated in 2003. The instrument has 55 stops, three manuals and pedals. A unique feature of the organ is the option of playing 29 of the stops in either meantone or Wegscheider well-tempered tuning (the remaining stops being well-tempered).

See also

List of Catholic cathedrals in the United States
List of cathedrals in the United States
Roman Catholic Archdiocese of Omaha
List of churches in Omaha, Nebraska

References

External links

Official Cathedral web site
Roman Catholic Archdiocese of Omaha official web site

Landmarks in North Omaha, Nebraska
Roman Catholic churches in Omaha, Nebraska
Cecilia
National Register of Historic Places in Omaha, Nebraska
Churches on the National Register of Historic Places in Nebraska
Omaha Landmarks
History of North Omaha, Nebraska
Roman Catholic churches completed in 1959
20th-century Roman Catholic church buildings in the United States
Tourist attractions in Omaha, Nebraska
Thomas Rogers Kimball buildings